The Cinta Senese is a breed of domestic pig from the province of Siena, in Tuscany, central Italy. Since 2006 animals raised in Tuscany have had DOP status, and are officially named Suino Cinto Toscano DOP. The Cinta Senese is one of the six autochthonous pig breeds recognised by the Ministero delle Politiche Agricole Alimentari e Forestali, the Italian ministry of agriculture and forestry.

The Cinta Senese is particularly associated with the Montagnola Senese and the comuni of Casole d'Elsa, Castelnuovo Berardenga, Gaiole in Chianti, Monteriggioni, Siena and Sovicille, in the area between the upper Merse and the upper Elsa rivers. It was in the past widely distributed throughout Tuscany.

A genealogical herdbook was established in the early 1930s. The population fell drastically after the Second World War, almost to the point of extinction, and the herdbook was discontinued in the 1960s. Following a recent recovery in numbers, the herdbook was re-opened in 1997, and is kept by the Associazione Nazionale Allevatori Suini, the Italian national association of pig breeders. The population remains low: at the end of 2007 it was 2867; the conservation status of the breed was listed as "endangered" by the FAO in the same year. At the end of 2012 there were 2543 pigs registered, distributed over 111 farms.

References

Pig breeds originating in Italy
Italian products with protected designation of origin
Ark of Taste foods